The Afghanistan national under-23 football team also known as (Olympic Team or Afghanistan U-23) represents Afghanistan in international football competition in under-23 international football tournaments and Asian Games.

History
Football is one of the most popular sports in the country. At present, Afghanistan has a low level of participation in football due to lack of funds and security problems inside the country. The team won Silver in 2010 South Asian Games, the first time Afghanistan reached the final of the tournaments. Balal Arezou of Afghanistan was named one of the most valuable player of the tournament.

Results and fixtures
The following are Afghanistan's results and fixtures as of 25 March 2015

* Afghanistan score always listed first

Records

Summer Olympic Games
Young teams were favoured by FIFA and the IOC, and since 1992, male competitors must be under 23 years old, with three over-23 players allowed per squad.

Asian Games Records

See also
Football at the 2014 Asian Games
Football at the 2014 Asian Games – Men's team squads
2016 AFC U-23 Championship qualification
Afghanistan national football team
Afghanistan women's national football team

Notable players
 Israfeel Kohistani
 Balal Arezou
 Faisal Sakhizada
 Waheed Nadeem

References

Under-23
Asian national under-23 association football teams
Youth football in Afghanistan